P. V. Sreenijin  is an Indian politician serving as the MLA of Kunnathunad constituency since 24 May 2021. In the 2021 Kerala Legislative Assembly election, he won by a margin of 2,715 votes, defeating V. P. Sajeendran of the UDF.

References 

Kerala MLAs 2021–2026
Communist Party of India (Marxist) politicians from Kerala